Edouard Zeckendorf (2 May 1901 – 16 May 1983) was a Belgian doctor, army officer and amateur mathematician. In mathematics, he is best known for his work on Fibonacci numbers and in particular for proving Zeckendorf's theorem, though he published over 20 papers, mostly in number theory.

Zeckendorf was born in Liège in 1901. He was the son of Abraham Zeckendorf, Dutch dentist and practicing Jew. In 1925, Zeckendorf graduated as a medical doctor from the University of Liège and joined the Belgian Army medical corps. When Germany invaded Belgium in 1940, Zeckendorf was taken prisoner and remained a prisoner of war until 1945. During this period, he provided medical care to other allied POWs.

Zeckendorf retired from the army in 1957 as a colonel.

References 

20th-century Belgian mathematicians
1901 births
1983 deaths
University of Liège alumni
Physicians from Liège
Belgian military personnel of World War II
Belgian prisoners of war in World War II
Amateur mathematicians
Belgian people of Dutch descent
People of Dutch-Jewish descent
Jewish physicians
Belgian Army officers
World War II prisoners of war held by Germany